Janovce may refer to several places in Slovakia:

Janovce, a village in Bardejov District
Jánovce, a village in Galanta District
Jánovce, a village in Poprad District